Campeonato Brasileiro 2008 may refer to:

Campeonato Brasileiro Série A 2008
Campeonato Brasileiro Série B 2008
Campeonato Brasileiro Série C 2008

See also 
 Campeonato Brasileiro (disambiguation)